Svyatoslavka is a rural locality (a selo) in Rakityansky District, Belgorod Oblast, Russia. The population was 345 as of 2010. There are 6 streets.

Geography 
Svyatoslavka is located 14 km northwest of Rakitnoye (the district's administrative centre) by road. Novoyasenovka is the nearest rural locality.

References 

Rural localities in Rakityansky District